Robert Wetsel Mitchell (April 25, 1933 – March 18, 2010) was an American invertebrate zoologist and photographer who was particularly active in the study of the biology of caves.

Mitchell was awarded Bachelor of Science (1954) and Master of Science (1955) degrees from Texas Tech University, and Doctor of Philosophy from the University of Texas at Austin in 1961. He also served in the United States Air Force Medical Service from 1955 to 1957.

Genera and species Mitchell described include Typhlochactas (1971), Typhlochactas reddelli (1968), Typhlochactas rhodesi (1968), and Sotanochactas elliotti (1971) .

Typhlochactas mitchelli or Pseudocellus mitchelli are named in honor of Mitchell.

References

External links
 scorpion files: "robert-w-mitchell-rip"

American zoologists
Texas Tech University alumni
University of Texas at Austin alumni
1933 births
2010 deaths
People from Wellington, Texas